A pidan is a type of silk cloth used in Cambodian and Khmer weddings, funerals, and Buddhist ceremonies as a canopy or tapestry. Pidan are often decorated with images of wats, nāgas, apsaras, scenes from the life of Buddha, Angkor Wat, animals (especially elephants), and plants.

Production
Pidan is produced by an experienced weaver. Because of this and it's silken composition, it is fairly expensive.

History 
Khmer textiles are a tradition dating back for over a millennium. As Cambodia had fallen under the governorship of French Indochina, pidan would begin to die. Then, in 1993, the Ministry of Culture and Fine Arts (Cambodia) revitalized the art of textile making among low-class artisans. This was to noticeable success. Later, the Artists Association of Cambodia found success funding and keeping some businesses (and by extension the pidan) alive.

Further reading
http://iktt.esprit-libre.org/en/2004/09/abstract_part_3_cambodian_text.html

Reference

Cambodian culture
Textiles